Flying Scot may refer to:

 Flying Scot (dinghy), a class of day sailer dinghy designed in 1957
 The Flying Scot (film), a 1957 British crime film directed by Compton Bennett
 Flying Scot (bicycles), a marque used by Scottish bicycle manufacturer, David Rattray and Co.
 Scottish Formula One competitor, Jackie Stewart.

See also 
 Flying Scotsman (disambiguation)